Guido Gerig is a computer scientist who works as a professor of computer science and engineering at the New York University Tandon School of Engineering.

Research
Gerig's research supports various clinical imaging studies with image analysis methodologies related to segmentation, registration, shape analysis, and image statistics.

Awards and honors
 IEEE Fellow 2019, for contributions to medical image processing
 AIMBE Fellow 2012, for outstanding research contributions to the field of three-dimensional image analysis
 MICCAI Fellow 2009, for scientific contributions to neuro-imaging and image analysis, and service to the field through conference organization and committee membership

References

Fellow Members of the IEEE
New York University faculty
ETH Zurich alumni
Computer scientists
Year of birth missing (living people)
Living people